Dinh Tien-Cuong (Vietnamese: Đinh Tiến Cường, born May 1973 in Hai Duong, Vietnam) is a Vietnamese mathematician educated by the French school of mathematics, and Provost’s chair professor at National University of Singapore (NUS). He held professorship at Pierre and Marie Curie University (2005–2014), part-time professorship at Ecole Polytechnique de Paris (2005–2014) and at Ecole Normale Supérieure de Paris (2012–2014). He is known for his work on Several Complex Variables and Complex Dynamical Systems in Higher Dimension.

Biography
Dinh Tien-Cuong studied computer science from 1990 to 1993 at Odessa University and mathematics from 1993 to 1997 at Pierre and Marie Curie University. He received in 1997 his PhD with thesis titled Enveloppe polynomiale d’un compact de longueur finie et problème du bord. His research deals with complex analysis and complex dynamics in several variables, including collaborations with Nessim Sibony and Nguyen Viet-Anh on Fatou-Julia theory in several complex variables and on singular foliations by Riemann surfaces.

Awards and honours
In 1989 he won a gold medal with full score 42/42 at the 30th International Mathematical Olympiad. He was a junior member of Institut Universitaire de France from 2007 to 2012. In 2018 he was an Invited Speaker and gave a talk Pluripotential Theory and Complex Dynamics in Higher Dimension at the 2018 International Congress of Mathematicians (ICM) in Rio. Also in 2018, he received the Humboldt Prize from Alexander von Humboldt foundation.

Selected publications

References 

Living people
1973 births
Academic staff of the National University of Singapore
20th-century Vietnamese mathematicians
École Polytechnique
Écoles Normales Supérieures
21st-century Vietnamese mathematicians